was the name of an ancient title of nobility in the kabane system of Yamato period Japan from the 4th through 6th century AD, before the introduction of the Ritsuryō system. It is thought that the agatanushi were originally chieftains of small Kofun period tribal states which had been annexed by the Yamato state. 

Per the Chinese “History of the Sui Dynasty”, (589-618), Yamato was divided into kuni (国 provinces), which were subdivided into agata (県), which were governed respectively by kuni no miyatsuko and agatanushi, who were responsible for collecting tribute. However, these offices seem to have been a confirmation of de facto local power, rather than a granting of office by the Yamato Court.

References
 

Ancient Japan
Japanese historical terms
Asuka period
Kofun period
Titles